Beth Van Schaack is an American attorney and academic who serves as the United States ambassador-at-large for global criminal justice.

Early life and education
Van Schaack obtained a bachelor of arts from Stanford University, a juris doctor from Yale Law School, and a PhD from Leiden Law School at the University of Leiden.

Career
Van Schaack was a visiting professor in human rights at Stanford Law School, teaching in areas relating to international law and human rights. She has been the acting director of the human rights and conflict resolution clinic. She is a fellow with Stanford’s Center for Human Rights and International Justice. She was also a visiting professor at Santa Clara University School of Law focusing on laws of war. As an attorney, she was an associate at Morrison & Foerster LLP, as well as working with the Office of the Prosecutor of the International Criminal Tribunals for Yugoslavia and Rwanda.

US State Department
She served as deputy to the ambassador-at-large for war crimes issues in the Office of Global Criminal Justice at the State Department. She helped advise the secretary of state and the under secretary of state for civilian security, democracy, and human rights on the formation of U.S. policy aimed at curbing mass atrocities and genocide.

Ambassador at Large

On October 21, 2021, President Joe Biden nominated Van Schaack to be the ambassador-at-large for global criminal justice. Hearings were held before the Senate Foreign Relations Committee on January 12, 2022. The committee favorably reported her nomination to the Senate floor on March 8, 2022. Van Schaack was confirmed by the Senate via voice vote on March 15, 2022, and she was sworn in on March 17.

Publications
Imagining Justice for Syria

References

External links

Living people
21st-century American diplomats
American lawyers
American academics
American writers
United States Department of State officials
Yale Law School alumni
Stanford University alumni
Leiden University alumni
Year of birth missing (living people)
People associated with Morrison & Foerster
American women lawyers
Biden administration personnel